The International Tour of Hellas is a road bicycle racing stage race. It consists of five stages and is usually held between April and May. The race was first held in 1968 as the Antiquities Trophy, and was later known as the Tour of Hellas (or Greece). The race was held sporadically from 1968 until 2012. The Union Cycliste Internationale (UCI) made the race part of the UCI Europe Tour in 2005; the race had previously been held as an amateur event. The race was revived in 2022 as a category 2.1 event on the UCI Europe Tour.

Cycling Greece is the organizing committee for the race in collaboration with the Hellenic Cycling Federation and the local authorities of the hosting cities.

History 
Nikos Kapsokefalos envisioned the organization of the first Tour of Hellas, drawing inspiration from the popularity of the Tour de France and the Giro d'Italia at the time. The first edition of the race was held in 1968, and was known as the Tour of Ancient Monuments. The first stage was held on 7 October, covering  from Athens to Delphi, and the first overall winner was Danish rider Gerhard Nielsen.

The second edition was held in 1981, 13 years after the first edition. That year, Greek riders completed a podium sweep, with Kanellos Kanellopoulos (PO Patras) becoming the first Greek cyclist to win the race.

After several problems, the race, now known as the Tour of Hellas, returned in 2002. The race went on its most recent hiatus after 2012 due to a lack of financial resources and sponsors.

On 13 December 2021, the Greek Ministry of Culture and Sports announced that the race, which was rebranded as the International Tour of Hellas, would return in 2022.

Past winners 
Sources:

Wins per country

References

External links 
 

Cycle races in Greece
Recurring sporting events established in 1968
UCI Europe Tour races
1968 establishments in Greece